Nothofagus solandri var. solandri, commonly called black beech, is a variety of the tree species Nothofagus solandri, endemic to New Zealand. Black beech occurs on both the North and the South Island at low altitudes up to the mountains. The other variety of N. solandri is called mountain beech or Nothofagus solandri var. cliffortioides, and grows at higher altitudes than black beech. In New Zealand the taxon is called Fuscospora solandri.

Black beech is a medium-sized evergreen tree growing to 27 m tall. The leaves are oppositely arranged, ovoid, 10 mm long and 5 mm broad, with smooth margins.

Black beech is known as black beech because it is prone to a sooty mold which covers the trunk and branches. This, in turn, is the result of a scale insect which sucks sap from the tree, and excretes honeydew, a sweet liquid, in small droplets (less than 1 mm diameter) on the end of stalks. This feeds the sooty mold, and also forms a valuable high-energy food source for various birds and insects including the kaka. The infestation is common and does not appear to harm the tree.

Black beech and mountain beech have both been planted in Great Britain, and mountain beech has shown better cold tolerance than black beech in locations such as Scotland.

Hybrids
 Black beech is known to hybridise freely with mountain beech (Nothofagus solandri var. cliffortioides]]) where the two species co-exist, and in some places the hybrids may form complex introgressive hybrid swarms.
 Black beech hybridises with hard beech (Nothofagus truncata) to form the hybrid species Nothofagus × apiculata.
 Black beech hybridises with red beech (Nothofagus fusca) to form the hybrid species Nothofagus × dubia.

References

External links

 University of Waikato: Nothofagus

Nothofagaceae
Endemic flora of New Zealand
Trees of New Zealand
Garden plants of New Zealand
Ornamental trees